KTFS (940 AM) is a radio station broadcasting a gospel music format. Licensed to Texarkana, Texas, United States, it serves the Texarkana area. The station is currently owned by Texarkana Radio Center.   Studios are located on Olive in Texarkana, Texas just one block west of the Texas/Arkansas state line and its transmitter is on South State Line Avenue.

KTFS was operated from a broadcast facility located on State Line Avenue on the Texarkana, Texas side. During that time the station operated with 250 watts, increasing power to 1,000 watts in 1967.

Dave Hall was the News Director and broke the 'Fouke Monster' story, in Fouke, on a Sunday morning via a mobile car phone.

In December 2011, KTFS was taken off the air after vandals committed vandalism at its broadcasting tower. The station filed a Special Temporary Authority to Remain Silent with the FCC on January 9, 2012, which they honored shortly afterward.

On December 20, 2012, KTFS returned to the air with a news/talk format, just two days before the station's license was set to expire.

On April 19, 2013, KTFS changed formats to classic hits, simulcasting KTTY. The station's callsign was changed to KCMC on March 21, 2014.

On July 1, 2017, KCMC changed formats from classic hits to talk.

On November 28, 2017, KCMC's callsign was changed back to KTFS.

On January 22, 2019, KTFS changed their format from talk to gospel, branded as "KTOY Gospel 105.9" (simulcast on FM translator K290CP 105.9 FM Texarkana).

Translator

References

External links
Gospel 105.9 Facebook

Gospel radio stations in the United States
TFS (AM)